Pascal Morvillers (born 24 February 1956) is a French equestrian. He competed at the 1984 Summer Olympics and the 1988 Summer Olympics.

References

External links
 

1956 births
Living people
French male equestrians
Olympic equestrians of France
Equestrians at the 1984 Summer Olympics
Equestrians at the 1988 Summer Olympics
Sportspeople from Somme (department)